The Halmahera giant gecko (Gehyra marginata), also known as the Ternate dtella, is a species of gecko endemic to Indonesia.

References

Gehyra
Reptiles described in 1887
Endemic fauna of New Guinea